The 1966 Drexel Dragons football team represented the Drexel Institute of Technology (renamed Drexel University in 1970) as a member of the Middle Atlantic Conference during the 1966 NCAA College Division football season.  Tom Grebis was the team's head coach.

Schedule

Roster

References

Drexel
Drexel Dragons football seasons
Drexel Dragons football